Carlo Pietro Tagliabue (January 13, 1898 in Mariano Comense – April 5, 1978 in Monza) was an Italian baritone.

After studies with Leopoldo Gennai and Annibale Guidotti he made his debut in Lodi, Lombardy, in Loreley and Aida.  His debuts in Genoa (1923), Torino, La Scala (1930), Rome (1931), and Naples (1931) were all in Tristan und Isolde (sung in Italian).  He also performed in Wagner's Götterdämmerung, Tannhäuser and Lohengrin.  However, Tagliabue would go on to excel in the Verdian repertoire, especially La forza del destino, Aida, Rigoletto, La traviata, Nabucco, and Otello. He created the role of Basilio in Respighi's La fiamma in 1934.

His international career included Buenos Aires' Teatro Colón (1934), the Metropolitan Opera, New York City (1937–39), and San Francisco Opera and Covent Garden, London (1938). Tagliabue's last performance was in 1955 at La Scala, at the famous performance of La traviata conducted by Carlo Maria Giulini and directed by Luchino Visconti, where Maria Callas scandalized the public by throwing her shoes off.

In his book Voci Parallele Giacomo Lauri-Volpi wrote, "[Tagliabue] is the only survivor of a school that knows that in Rigoletto, in Ballo in Maschera, Trovatore, Traviata a melodramatic piece should be sung, measured and breathed musically in line with the mastery of great art."

Sources

Lauri-Volpi G. (1955) Voci parallele. Milan
Rosenthal, Harold (1992), 'Tagliabue, Carlo' in The New Grove Dictionary of Opera, ed. Stanley Sadie (London) 

Italian operatic baritones
1898 births
1978 deaths
People from the Province of Como
20th-century Italian male opera singers